A tricordia (also trichordia or tricordio) or mandriola is a twelve-stringed variation of the mandolin. The tricordia is used in Mexican folk music, while its European cousin, the mandriola, is used identically to the mandolin. It differs from a standard mandolin in that it has three strings per course.  Mandriolas only use unison tuning (G3 G3 G3 • D4 D4 D4 • A4 A4 A4 • E5 E5 E5), while tricordias  use either unison tuning or octave tuning (G2 G3 G3 • D3 D4 D4 • A3 A4 A4 • E4 E5 E5).

References 

Mandolin family instruments
Necked bowl lutes